Malawi Airlines (Malawian Airlines until 2016) is the flag carrier airline of Malawi, based in Lilongwe and with its hub at Lilongwe International Airport. It was established in 2012 after the liquidation of Air Malawi, the former national airline. Ethiopian Airlines operates it under a management contract and owns 49% of the airline after it emerged as the winner following competitive bidding.

On 25 March 2021, the Board of Directors of the company passed a resolution recommending the "orderly winding up of the company" due to heavy debts and technical insolvency.  However, on 5 May 2021 the Government of Malawi confirmed that it intended to recapitalise the airline instead. In 2022, the airline announced its first annual profit of MWK 4 billion (USD 4.0 million).

History

Operations commenced on  serving the Blantyre–Lilongwe domestic route using 67-seater Bombardier Q400 aircraft. Johannesburg was added to the route network two weeks later, on 17 February, and Dar es Salaam was incorporated on 18 February.

Corporate affairs

Ownership
The airline is owned by the Government of Malawi (51%) and Ethiopian Airlines (49%). The government planned to offload 31% of its stake to private investors after a minimum period of 12 months after operations commence and it expected to earn US$6 million from this sale. In March 2016 Jimmy Lipunga, CEO of The Public Private Partnership Commission (PPPC), said that plans by the Malawi government to sell some shares in the airline to members of the public would depend on the airline attaining profitability.

Business trends

Malawi Airlines was not profitable from its launch in 2014 until it reported a profit for 2021.  Few financial and other trends have been made available by either of the main shareholders (years ending 31 December):

As of April 2021, the company has incurred cumulative losses of MWK 14.09 billion (USD 17.86 million) and has accumulated debts of MWK 13.83 billion (USD 17.54 million). However, in June 2022, the airline announced that it had recorded its first profitable year with profits of MWK 4 billion (USD 4 million) in 2021.

Head office
The airline's head office is located within the Golden Peacock Shopping Complex in Lilongwe.

Destinations
Malawian Airlines serves the following destinations, :

Fleet
As of February 2023 the airline's fleet consists of the following aircraft:

See also
 Airlines of Africa
 Air Malawi
 Transport in Malawi

References

External links

 Ethiopian Airways Becomes Strategic Partner of Malawian Airlines

Airlines of Malawi
Airlines established in 2013
Lilongwe
2013 establishments in Malawi
Ethiopian Airlines